This is a list of the 14 members of the European Parliament for Slovakia in the 2004 to 2009 session.

List

Party representation

External links
 Official website

Notes

2004
List
Slovakia